Li Mi may refer to the following Chinese people:

Li Mi (Jin dynasty) (李密; 224–287), official of Shu Han and the Jin dynasty
Li Mi (Sui dynasty) (李密; 582–619), rebel leader against the Sui dynasty
Li Mi (chancellor) (李泌; 722–789), official of the Tang dynasty
Li Mi (Republic of China general) (李彌; 1902–1973)